This is a list of places in New Zealand with reduplicated names, often as a result of the grammatical rules of the Māori language from which many of the names derive.

In Maori, both partial and full reduplication occurs. The change in sense is sometimes to reduce the intensity of the meaning, e.g. wera, hot, werawera, warm.

The information in the list below is sourced from the Heinemann New Zealand Atlas, Copyright Department of Lands and Survey Information (maps) and Octopus Publishing Group (NZ) Ltd (text), first published in 1987, reprinted 1990,

Place names
Hari Hari
Horohoro
Karekare
Karikari Peninsula
Katikati
Kawakawa
Kerikeri
Kihikihi
Kohukohu
Korokoro
Matamata
Matata
Meremere
Mimi
Mitimiti
Mt Kaukau
Naenae
Okuku
Ongaonga
Peka Peka
Piopio
Ramarama

See also
List of reduplicated place names
List of reduplicated Australian place names

References

New Zealand
Reduplicated
New Zealand repeated
 Place names
New Zealand